is a 2D head-to-head fighting game with 3D graphics co-produced by Capcom and Arika and originally released in 1998 as a coin-operated arcade game for the Sony ZN-2 hardware. It is the sequel to the original Street Fighter EX, a 3D spin-off of the Street Fighter series. An updated version of the game titled Street Fighter EX2 Plus was released in 1999 in arcades as well and subsequently ported to the PlayStation the same year.

Gameplay
The original version of Street Fighter EX2 retains all of the features from the previous game, Street Fighter EX Plus, including original features such as "Guard Breaks" (unique moves which cannot be blocked by an opponent) and "Super Canceling" (the ability to cancel a Super Combo into another Super Combo).

The primary new feature in the game are "Excel Combos", ("excel" being an abbreviation for "extra cancel"). Much like the "Custom Combos"  featured in the Street Fighter Alpha series, Excel Combos allows player to connect a series of basic and special moves for a limited time. During an Excel Combo, the player begins with a basic move and can follow up with a different basic move or follow-up a basic move with a special move, which can be followed by a different special move. However, the player cannot connect any move with the same move, nor is it possible to cancel special moves into basic moves during an Excel Combo.

Characters
Recurring Street Fighter characters Ryu, Ken, Chun-Li, Zangief, and Guile, all of whom were in the original Street Fighter EX, return in EX2, along with original characters Hokuto, Doctrine Dark, Skullomania, and Cracker Jack. Dhalsim, who was in Street Fighter EX Plus α, also returns along with four additional characters new to the EX series: Blanka and Vega from Street Fighter II, along with new characters Sharon (a redheaded female special agent) and Hayate (a Japanese swordsman). Allen Snider, Blair Dame, Darun Mister, Pullum Purna and M. Bison were omitted from the original version of Street Fighter EX2, although Darun, Pullum and M. Bison would later return in Street Fighter EX2 Plus, while Allen and Blair would be featured in an unrelated 1998 Arika-developed arcade fighting game Fighting Layer. Street Fighter character Sakura Kasugano was omitted from EX2 games, but returned in the sequel Street Fighter EX3.

The game also features four hidden characters: Kairi, from the original EX, returns as a hidden character, along with new characters Shadow Geist (a costumed vigilante similar to Skullomania) and Nanase (Hokuto and Kairi's sister, a young girl who wields a staff). Garuda, from the original EX, returns as a boss character. All four characters can be selected by the player after meeting certain requirements.

Versions

Arcade
Street Fighter EX2 Plus, an enhanced version of Street Fighter EX2, was released in arcades on June 11, 1999. EX2 Plus retains all of the characters from the original version except for Hayate (which was removed from the arcade version). M. Bison, Darun, and Pullum Purna, who were all excluded from the original Street Fighter EX2, return in EX2 Plus. Sagat makes his debut in the EX series in EX2 Plus along with new characters Vulcano Rosso (an Italian martial artist) and Area (a young girl equipped with a large mechanical right arm), with Nanase was promoted as a regular character. A non-selectable version of M. Bison named "Bison II" appears in the game as an opponent in single-player mode.

In addition to the Super Combos and Excel Combos in the original EX2, EX2 Plus also features "Meteor Combos", more powerful versions of Super Combos which can only be performed filling up all three stocks of the Super Combo gauge. While the previous EX games featured characters who had Lv.3-only Super Combos, it became a standard feature for all of the characters in EX2 Plus, with each character having at least one Meteor Combo. The Excel Combo system from the original EX2 was also revised slightly. The player can now connect a basic move or a special move into the same move instead of being limited to a different move.

Home
The home console version of Street Fighter EX2 Plus for the PlayStation was released in December 1999. The PlayStation version features arcade, versus, and practice modes, along with an all new "Director mode" and a satellite-smashing "bonus game", and also includes Hayate from the original EX2 as a secret character.

Music
Like the previous game, the music was written by former Namco composers Takayuki Aihara, Shinji Hosoe, and Ayako Saso. A soundtrack CD was released on June 18, 1998 by Scitron.

A 13-track arranged album was also released on July 23, 1998 by Suleputer, with arrangements by the original composers, along with Yasunori Mitsuda and Toshimichi Isoe.

Reception

In Japan, Game Machine listed Street Fighter EX2 on their July 1, 1998 issue as being the most-successful arcade game of the month.

GameSpot praised the new characters and the graphics, but complained about the static ending sequences, as well as the lack of originality or new features. PSX Extreme stated that "When I take a look at SNK's cheap and blurry Fatal Fury: Wild Ambition and compare it to Capcom's Street Fighter EX 2 Plus, I see garbage and then I see one of the most polished looking fighting games to date, and obviously I am talking about EX2." They went on to summarize the game as "one of the most enhanced and entertaining Street Fighters ever".

References

External links

 Arika's official Street Fighter EX2 website (Waybacked) 
 Arika's official Street Fighter EX2 Plus website (Waybacked) 
 

1998 video games
Arcade video games
Arika games
PlayStation (console) games
Street Fighter games
Video game spin-offs
Video games developed in Japan
Video games scored by Shinji Hosoe
Video games set in Thailand
Video games set in Canada
Video games set in Hong Kong
Video games set in South America
Video games set in Japan
Video games set in New Zealand
Virgin Interactive games
Fighting games
2D fighting games

ja:ストリートファイターEX